Tracye Lawyer (born August 28, 1977, in Santa Barbara, California) is an American heptathlete.  In international competition, she won the heptathlon at the 2000 NACAC Under-25 Championships in Athletics.  She also took silver at the inaugural NACAC Combined Events Championships in 2005.

Prep
Lawyer attended Cate School in Carpinteria, California, where she won the CIF California State Meet Championship in the high jump as a sophomore in 1993.  She also finished third in 1994 and second in 1995.

NCAA
Next she went to Stanford University, where she achieved the 1999 NCAA Women's Outdoor Track and Field Championship in the heptathlon.  Previous to that she had been third in 1997 and second in 1998.  During that period she won the PAC-10 Championships three years in a row and set the still standing Stanford record in the event. She also played soccer at Stanford as a midfielder.

International Success
A noted first day specialist, she finished 7th at the 2000 U.S. Olympic Trials.  Four years later she finished eighth.

Post competition
She was formerly an assistant coach at Stanford University, and is now an orthopedic surgery resident at the University of Mississippi Medical Center.

References

1977 births
Living people
American heptathletes
People from Santa Barbara, California
African-American female track and field athletes
Track and field athletes from California
People from Carpinteria, California
Stanford Cardinal women's soccer players
American women's soccer players
Women's association football midfielders
Stanford Cardinal women's track and field athletes
21st-century African-American sportspeople
21st-century African-American women
20th-century African-American sportspeople
20th-century African-American women